is a Japanese bobsledder. He competed in the two man and the four man events at the 1992 Winter Olympics.

References

1969 births
Living people
Japanese male bobsledders
Olympic bobsledders of Japan
Bobsledders at the 1992 Winter Olympics
Sportspeople from Hokkaido